James Bateman (18 July 1811 – 27 November 1897) was a British landowner and accomplished horticulturist. He developed Biddulph Grange after moving there around 1840, from nearby Knypersley Hall in Staffordshire, England. He created the famous gardens at Biddulph with the aid of his wife Maria and his friend and painter of seascapes Edward William Cooke.  From 1865–70 he was the founding president of the North Staffordshire Field Club, the large local club which to this day researches local natural history and folklore.

Biography 

He was born at Redvales near Bury in Lancashire, he matriculated with Lincoln College, Oxford, in 1829, graduating from Magdalen College with a BA in 1834 and an MA in 1845. Over the twenty years he made a great deal of money in iron, engineering and banking.
In 1861, Bateman and his notable sons (who included the painter Robert Bateman) gave up the house and gardens at Biddulph, and he moved to Kensington in London. 
He later moved to Worthing in Sussex, where he died on 27 November 1897.

Collector of plants
"MA Magdalen College, Oxford, 1845, took great interest in collecting and cultivating tropical plants; FLS, 1833; FRS, 1838; fellow of Royal Horticultural Society; published writings on orchids and other horticultural subjects."

He was a collector of and scholar on orchids, President of the North Staffordshire Field Society, and served on the Royal Horticultural Society's Plant Exploration Committee.  He especially loved rhododendrons and azaleas. He had a number of notable sons who grew up at Biddulph Grange, including the painter Robert Bateman.

Bateman was "a collector and scholar on orchids," and "was one of the early developers of orchid culture. He sponsored expeditions to Mexico and South America enabling collectors to gather rare specimens. He published three lavish books about orchids. He pioneered "cool orchid cultivation" which enabled the Odontoglossum to be cultivated in England, replicating the cool arid climate of the cloud forests in Central America where these exotic flowers are found. Walter Hood Fitch, (1817–1892)...was employed by Bateman to create the paintings for his magnificent orchid books...exceedingly rare, A Monograph of Odontoglossum, is composed of thirty large scale hand-coloured lithographs." The naturalist, Charles Darwin "received a box of orchids from Bateman on 25 January 1862 (and) a letter from him dated 28 January 1862."

Garden designer
He created the famous gardens at Biddulph with the aid of his botanist wife Maria and his friend and painter of seascapes Edward William Cooke. His gardens at Biddulph are a rare survival of the interim period between Capability Brown landscape garden and the High Victorian style. The gardens are compartmentalised and divided into themes.

Bateman "was also responsible for laying out the Arboretum at Derby, the first public park in England."

The children's book by Priscilla Masters, Mr Bateman's Garden (1987), is a fantasy set in the gardens.

Family
On 24 April 1838, he married Maria Sybilla, third daughter of Rowland Egerton Warburton and sister of Peter Egerton Warburton; they had three sons, John, Rowland, and Robert (a notable painter), and a daughter, Katherine, who married Ulrick Ralph Burke.

Publications
 The Orchidaceae of Mexico and Guatemala by James Bateman, c.1845 "Only 125 copies of this book were published. It is physically one of the largest botanical books ever published."
 A Second Century of Orchidaceous Plants, by James Bateman, London: L. Reeve & Co., 1867. "Large-4to (315 x 245 mm). pp. viii, with 100 beautifully handcoloured lithographed plates and descriptive text."
 A monograph of Odontoglossum by James Bateman, London: L. Reeve & Co., 1874. Facsimile of the title page

See also
 Edward William Cooke
 Biddulph Grange

References

Attribution

External links

James Bateman's work on orchids
View digitized titles by James Bateman in Botanicus.org
James Bateman and Orchid Literature 
Picture of James Bateman
Missouri Botanical Garden – A monograph of Odontoglossum

1811 births
1897 deaths
People from Bury, Greater Manchester
English gardeners
Alumni of Lincoln College, Oxford
Alumni of Magdalen College, Oxford
Orchidologists
Fellows of the Royal Society
Fellows of the Linnean Society of London